Kalina Point (‘Nos Kalina’ \'nos ka-'li-na\) is the rocky point on the south side of the entrance to Domlyan Bay on Oscar II Coast in Graham Land.  It is situated at the east extremity of Parlichev Ridge, and was formed as a result of the break-up of Larsen Ice Shelf in the area, and the retreat of Melville Glacier in the early 21st century.  The feature is named after the settlements of Kalina in Northwestern and Northeastern Bulgaria.

Location
SCAR Antarctic Digital Database mapping in 2012.

Maps
 Antarctic Digital Database (ADD). Scale 1:250000 topographic map of Antarctica. Scientific Committee on Antarctic Research (SCAR). Since 1993, regularly upgraded and updated.

References
 Kalina Point. SCAR Composite Antarctic Gazetteer.
 Bulgarian Antarctic Gazetteer. Antarctic Place-names Commission. (details in Bulgarian, basic data in English)

External links
 Kalina Point. Copernix satellite image

Headlands of Graham Land
Oscar II Coast
Bulgaria and the Antarctic